Side Cut Metropark is a regional park in Maumee, Ohio, owned and managed by Metroparks Toledo and named for being a sidecut on the Miami and Erie Canal. The sidecut was built over an 18-year period in the nineteenth century and completed in 1842, opening to boat traffic the following year. It closed in 1850 after being bypassed by an extension of the main canal. It was listed on the National Register of Historic Places in 1973.

It features Bluegrass Island, a popular fishing destination. Obtained from the state of Ohio in the 1920s, Side Cut was the original metropark.

References

External links
Metroparks Toledo
Park Map

Protected areas of Lucas County, Ohio
Parks in Ohio
Works Progress Administration in Toledo, Ohio
Civilian Conservation Corps in Ohio
Metroparks Toledo
National Register of Historic Places in Lucas County, Ohio